Timeless is a 2016 German science fiction film directed by Alexander Tuschinski. Besides many German actors, it stars Helmut Berger, Harry Lennix, Rick Shapiro, Angus Macfadyen and Zachi Noy. It had its world premiere at Paris Independent Film Festival on November 27, 2016.

Plot 
The film is about a young man, Arnold Richter, who suddenly travels in time from Germany 1932 to a near-future where a new dictatorship rises. There he gets involved in events and adventures which lead to a full-blown revolution.

Production 

The production was filmed in Germany. The cast mostly consisted of German actors, such as David Pakosch, along with Helmut Berger, Harry Lennix, Rick Shapiro, Angus Macfadyen and Zachi Noy. Alexander Tuschinski wrote many major parts specifically with the actors portraying them in mind, and worked on the characters in close connection with the actors during preparation and during filming.

For sequences set on the Eastern Front in 1945, the film uses one of the few drivable Soviet T-34/85 tanks in Germany.  Those scenes were filmed near Dresden. Sequences depicting American troops on the Western Front in 1944 were filmed in an old factory building in Stuttgart.

The film was scheduled to have its world premiere in 2016. After multiple festival screenings in 2017 (among them at Berlin Independent Film Festival and Hollywood Reel Independent Film Festival where it won "Best International Film") it was released on Amazon in January 2018.

References

External links 
 

2016 films
German science fiction films
2010s German films